Teuvo Johannes Moilanen (born 12 December 1973), also known as Tepi Moilanen, is a Finnish former professional footballer who played as a goalkeeper. He has represented Ilves, FF Jaro and FC KooTeePee in the Finnish top division Veikkausliiga. His later clubs include Preston North End and Heart of Midlothian F.C. and brief loan spells in Scarborough F.C. and Darlington F.C. Teuvo was selected as the Preston North End Player of the Year Award Winner after season 1997–98. In 2006, he was playing for Tampere United and had a loan spell at FC Hämeenlinna.

References

External links

Profile at londonhearts.com

1973 births
Living people
Sportspeople from Oulu
Finnish footballers
Finnish expatriate footballers
Finland international footballers
Association football goalkeepers
FF Jaro players
Preston North End F.C. players
Heart of Midlothian F.C. players
Scarborough F.C. players
Darlington F.C. players
Tampere United players
FC Hämeenlinna players
English Football League players
Scottish Premier League players
Veikkausliiga players
Expatriate footballers in England
Expatriate footballers in Scotland